is a hot waterfall near Lake Onnetō in Akan National Park, Hokkaidō, Japan. Water of a temperature of 43 °C descends from a height of 30m. Formerly a rotenburo, its use as an open-air bath was discontinued after it was discovered that the site and its black mud contains an important deposit of manganese. The  was designated a Natural Monument of Japan in 2000.

See also
Kamuiwakka Hot Falls
List of Special Places of Scenic Beauty, Special Historic Sites and Special Natural Monuments

References

Waterfalls of Japan
Akan National Park
Landforms of Hokkaido
Tourist attractions in Hokkaido